Patricia C. Skinner (born 12 May 1930) is a former fencer. She competed in the women's individual foil event at the 1964 Summer Olympics representing Northern Rhodesia.

References

External links
 

1930 births
Possibly living people
Zambian female foil fencers
Olympic fencers of Northern Rhodesia
Fencers at the 1964 Summer Olympics
Northern Rhodesia people